This is a list of Malaysian coats of arms. Each of the thirteen States of Malaysia has their own coat of arms. In Malay, the coat of arms is called a jata.

National

States

Historical

References and notes

See also 
 List of Malaysian flags

 List
Malaysia